Saint-Martin-du-Bois is a former commune in the Maine-et-Loire department in western France. On 15 December 2016, it was merged into the new commune Segré-en-Anjou Bleu. Its population was 1,007 in 2019.

Geography
The river Oudon forms the commune's southern border.

See also
Communes of the Maine-et-Loire department

References

Saintmartindubois